The Tsarevich (German: Der Zarewitsch) is a 1933 German historical musical film directed by Victor Janson and starring Mártha Eggerth, Hans Söhnker and Ery Bos. It is based on the 1927 operetta Der Zarewitsch by Franz Lehar. It was one of a number of operetta film that Eggerth appeared in during the decade.

The film's sets were designed by Walter Haag and Franz Schroedter. A separate French-language version  was also released.

Cast
Mártha Eggerth as Mary Collin  
Hans Söhnker as Der Zarewitsch  
Ery Bos as Prinzessin Dorothea  
Ida Wüst as Gräfin Landa  
Georg Alexander as Fürst Symoff  
Otto Wallburg as Graf Narkyn  
Anton Pointner as Ein Adjutant  
Paul Otto as Der Großfürst  
Max Gülstorff as Berthel  
Paul Heidemann as Iwan  
Hans Joachim Schaufuß as Stups

See also
The Tsarevich (1929)
The Little Czar (1954)

References

External links

1930s historical musical films
German historical musical films
Films of Nazi Germany
Films set in Russia
Films based on operettas
Operetta films
UFA GmbH films
German multilingual films
Films directed by Victor Janson
German black-and-white films
1933 multilingual films
1930s German films